Facino Cane da Casale (1360 – May 1412), born Bonifacio Cane, was an Italian condottiero.

Biography
Cane was born in Casale Monferrato to a noble family.

He trained in the military arts by fighting under Otto of Brunswick against Charles of Durazzo, in 1382. At 26 he became condottiero for the Scaliger and, later, Carraresi families. In 1387 he was hired by Theodore II, Marquess of Montferrat, with 400 knights, in the war against the House of Savoy.

Facino's aim in wars was almost exclusively the enrichment of himself and his soldiers, resulting in savage acts of ruthlessness and cruelties against the population. This led Theodore to dismiss Facino in 1397, and the condottiero moved first back to the da Carrara and, in 1401, to the Visconti. In 1400 he had also created the small seigniory for himself in Borgo San Martino. In 1404 his personal dominions included also Alessandria, Novara and Tortona.

In 1402, at the death of Duke Gian Galeazzo Visconti, he assumed the effective control of the Duchy of Milan. Facino died in Pavia in 1412: his widow Beatrice Lascaris di Tenda married the new duke Filippo Maria Visconti, who therefore inherited the cities, the treasure and the soldiers of Facino.

References

1360 births
1412 deaths
People from Casale Monferrato
14th-century condottieri
15th-century condottieri
Duchy of Milan people